Alanson Work Willcox (July 30, 1901 – April 27, 1978) was an American lawyer who served as general counsel to the U.S. Department of Health, Education and Welfare.

Willcox was born in Akron Ohio, the son of statistician Walter Francis Willcox. He graduated from The Hill School in 1918, Cornell in 1922, and Harvard Law School in 1926. At Cornell, he was a member of Psi Upsilon

References

1901 births
1978 deaths
The Hill School alumni
Cornell University alumni
Alumni of the University of Cambridge
Harvard Law School alumni